Holden is an unincorporated community on the border of Wayne Township in Auglaize County and Roundhead Township in Hardin County, in the U.S. state of Ohio.

History
A post office called Holden was established in 1899, and remained in operation until 1906. The community once had a sawmill.

References

Unincorporated communities in Auglaize County, Ohio
Unincorporated communities in Hardin County, Ohio
1899 establishments in Ohio
Unincorporated communities in Ohio